Roger Kane (born 1963) is an American politician. He is a Republican and former member of the Tennessee House of Representatives for the 89th district, encompassing part of Knox County, Tennessee, including Knoxville.

Biography

Early life
He was born on November 28, 1963. His father worked for the United States Army, and he has four siblings. He graduated from the University of Houston with a bachelor's in Business Administration and History Education. He currently is working on his Masters in Public Administration.

Career
In 1988, he started his career in insurance at the Farmers Insurance Group. In 1996, he moved to Tennessee and by 1999, he managed his own agency. Since 2007, he has also taught with Kaplan Financial Ltd.

He served as a Tennessee state representative. He was President of the Karns Business Association and the Karns Fair Board. He stepped down from those positions prior to taking office January 2013. He is also a member of the Knoxville Chamber of Commerce, the National Federation of Independent Business and the Karns High School Foundation. Karns Volunteer Fire Department board and the Tennessee College of Applied Technology Board

Personal life
He is married, and has four children. He attends the West Park Baptist Church in Knoxville. Leads the Special Needs Ministry since 2019

References

1963 births
Living people
University of Houston alumni
Republican Party members of the Tennessee House of Representatives
Politicians from Knoxville, Tennessee
21st-century American politicians